Dendropsophus timbeba is a species of frog in the family Hylidae.
It is found in Brazil, possibly Bolivia, and possibly Peru.
Its natural habitats are subtropical or tropical moist lowland forests, intermittent freshwater marshes, rural gardens, and heavily degraded former forest.

References

timbeba
Amphibians described in 1987
Taxonomy articles created by Polbot